The women's doubles tournament of the 2015 BWF World Championships (World Badminton Championships) took place from August 10 to 16. Tian Qing and Zhao Yunlei enter the competition as the current champions.

Seeds

  Misaki Matsutomo / Ayaka Takahashi (third round)
  Luo Ying / Luo Yu (third round)
  Wang Xiaoli / Yu Yang (quarterfinals)
  Christinna Pedersen / Kamilla Rytter Juhl (final)
  Tian Qing / Zhao Yunlei (champion)
  Ma Jin / Tang Yuanting (third round)
  Nitya Krishinda Maheswari / Greysia Polii (semifinals)
  Reika Kakiiwa / Miyuki Maeda (third round)

  Eefje Muskens / Selena Piek (third round)
  Chang Ye-na / Jung Kyung-eun (third round)
  Lee So-hee / Shin Seung-chan (third round)
  Vivian Hoo Kah Mun / Woon Khe Wei (second round)
  Jwala Gutta / Ashwini Ponnappa (quarterfinals)
  Shizuka Matsuo / Mami Naito (third round)
  Puttita Supajirakul / Sapsiree Taerattanachai (second round)
  Gabriela Stoeva / Stefani Stoeva (second round)

Draw

Finals

Section 1

Section 2

Section 3

Section 4

References
BWF Website

2015 BWF World Championships
BWF